Harrison Collins (March 10, 1836 – December 25, 1890) was an American soldier who received the Medal of Honor for valor during the American Civil War.

Biography
Collins served in the American Civil War in the 1st Tennessee Volunteer Cavalry for the Union Army. He received the Medal of Honor on February 24, 1865 for his actions at the Battle of Nashville.

Medal of Honor citation
Citation:

Capture of flag of Chalmer's Division (C.S.A.).

See also

List of American Civil War Medal of Honor recipients: A-F

References

External links

Military Times

1836 births
1890 deaths
Union Army soldiers
United States Army Medal of Honor recipients
People from Hawkins County, Tennessee
People of Tennessee in the American Civil War
American Civil War recipients of the Medal of Honor
Burials at Springfield National Cemetery